Geometric Shapes Extended is a Unicode block containing Webdings/Wingdings symbols, mostly different weights of squares, crosses, and saltires, and different weights of variously spoked asterisks, stars, and various color squares and circles for emoji.

The Geometric Shapes Extended block contains thirteen emoji: U+1F7E0–U+1F7EB and U+1F7F0.

History
The following Unicode-related documents record the purpose and process of defining specific characters in the Geometric Shapes Extended block:

References 

Unicode blocks